The Roland TB-303 Bass Line (also known as the 303) is a bass synthesizer released by Roland Corporation in 1981. Designed to simulate bass guitars, it was a commercial failure and was discontinued in 1984. However, cheap second-hand units were adopted by electronic musicians, and its "squelching" or "chirping" sound became a foundation of electronic dance music genres such as acid house, Chicago house and techno. It has inspired numerous clones.

Design and features

The TB-303 was manufactured by the Japanese company Roland. It was designed by Tadao Kikumoto, who also designed the Roland TR-909 drum machine. It was marketed as a "computerised bass machine" to replace the bass guitar. However, according to Forbes, it instead produces a "squelchy tone more reminiscent of a psychedelic mouth harp than a stringed instrument".

The TB-303 has a single oscillator, which produces either a "buzzy" sawtooth wave or a "hollow-sounding" square wave. This is fed into a 24dB/octave low-pass filter, which is manipulated by an envelope generator. Users program notes and slides using a basic sequencer.

Legacy

The TB-303's unrealistic sound made it unpopular with its target audience, those who wanted to replace bass guitars. It was discontinued in 1984, and Roland sold off remaining units cheaply. 10,000 units were manufactured.

The first track to use the TB-303 and enter the top ten of the UK Singles Chart was "Rip It Up" (1983), by the Scottish band Orange Juice. Charanjit Singh's 1982 album Synthesizing: Ten Ragas to a Disco Beat was another early use of a TB-303, alongside another Roland device, the TR-808 drum machine. The album remained obscure until the early 21st century, and is now recognized as a precursor to acid house.

The Chicago group Phuture bought a cheap TB-303 and began experimenting. By manipulating the synthesizer as it played, they created a unique "squelching, resonant and liquid sound". This became the foundation of the single "Acid Tracks", which was released in 1987 and created the acid genre. Acid, with the TB-303 as a staple sound, became popular worldwide, particularly as part of the UK's emerging rave culture known as the second summer of love.

In the late 1980s and early 1990s, as new acid styles emerged, the TB-303 was often overdriven, producing a harsher sound, such as on Hardfloor's 1992 EP "Acperience" and Interlect 3000's 1993 EP "Volcano". In 1995, the TB-303 was distorted and processed on Josh Wink hit "Higher State of Consciousness" and on Daft Punk's "Da Funk". 

In 2011, the Guardian named the release of the TB-303 one of the 50 key events in the history of dance music. The popularity of acid caused a dramatic increase in the price of used 303 units. As of 2014, units sold for over £1,000.

Successors 
The TB-303 has inspired numerous software emulations and clones, such as the TD-3 by Behringer, released in 2019. In 2014, Roland released the TB-3 Touch Bassline, with a touchpad interface and MIDI and USB  connections. In 2017, Roland released the TB-03, a miniaturized model featuring an LED display and delay and overdrive effects.

References

Further reading

T
Acid house
Grooveboxes
Monophonic synthesizers
Analog synthesizers
Musical instruments invented in the 1980s